Jason Zbigniew Maniecki (born August 15, 1972) is a former defensive tackle in the National Football League who played three seasons with the Tampa Bay Buccaneers.

NFL career 
Maniecki was drafted by the Buccaneers in the fifth round of the 1996 NFL Draft, serving as a backup on the defensive line for part of three seasons. His first and only sack in the NFL came during a 1997 game against the Atlanta Falcons. During the 1999 pre-season, Maniecki was injured and waived by the Buccaneers as part of an injury settlement.

After football 
Maniecki is now the president and "head coach" of All Pro Realty Network at Keller Williams Realty.

References

People from Rabka-Zdrój
People from Wisconsin Dells, Wisconsin
Polish emigrants to the United States
Tampa Bay Buccaneers players
American football defensive tackles
Wisconsin Badgers football players
Polish players of American football
1972 births
Living people
Sportspeople from Lesser Poland Voivodeship
Players of American football from Wisconsin